Apinan may refer to:

 Jeckster Apinan (born 1987), Filipino basketball player
 Apinan Kaewpila (born 1985), Thai footballer
 Apinan Poshyananda (born 1956), Thai curator and art writer
 Apinan Sukaphai (born 1983), Thai sprinter